Iron Hill School No. 112C, also known as the Iron Hill Museum, is a historic one-room school building located near Newark in New Castle County, Delaware.  It was designed by architect James Oscar Betelle and built in 1923, and is -story, rectangular frame, wood-shingled building on a concrete foundation with a medium-pitched gable roof.  The building measures 24 feet by 48 feet, and features a pedimented portico centered on the gable end in the Colonial Revival style.  The school was funded by Pierre S. du Pont as part of a reform and rebuilding of African-American schools in Delaware, between 1919 and 1928. The school was used until school segregation was abolished, which occurred at Iron Hill in 1965.

It was added to the National Register of Historic Places in 1995.

The Iron Hill Museum's exhibits include area iron ore mining, Lenni Lenape history and culture, rocks and minerals from around Delaware and around the world, mounted area wildlife, and a display of fossils found in the state.

References

External links

Iron Hill Museum website

One-room schoolhouses in Delaware
African-American history between emancipation and the civil rights movement
School buildings on the National Register of Historic Places in Delaware
Colonial Revival architecture in Delaware
School buildings completed in 1923
Schools in New Castle County, Delaware
Museums in Newark, Delaware
Natural history museums in Delaware
Geology museums in the United States
Paleontology in Delaware
National Register of Historic Places in New Castle County, Delaware
1923 establishments in Delaware